Rear Admiral Edward Simpson Jr. (September 16, 1860 – September 6, 1930) was a United States Navy officer who briefly served as the acting 20th Naval Governor of Guam from May 8, 1916 to May 30, 1916. Simpson, commandant of the U.S. Naval Base Subic Bay and the U.S. Naval Station Sangley Point, took the position pending the arrival of appointed Governor Captain Roy Campbell Smith. Prior to his command, he served as a naval attaché to London in 1911.

He was born in Annapolis, Maryland, to Rear Admiral Edward Simpson Sr. He retired in 1924, and died in his Ruxton, Maryland, home ten days before his 70th birthday.

References

Governors of Guam
United States Navy officers
1860 births
1930 deaths
United States Navy rear admirals